Samuel Giovane (born 28 March 2003) is an Italian professional footballer who plays as a central midfielder for  club Ascoli, on loan from Atalanta.

Club career
Giovane switched from the youth system of Cesena to Atalanta before the 2017–18 season. He received his first call-up to Atalanta's senior squad in January 2022.

On 4 August 2022, Giovane moved to Ascoli in Serie B on a season-long loan. He made his Serie B debut for Ascoli on 3 September 2022 in a game against Cittadella.

International career
Giovane was first called up to represent his country in February 2018 for the Under-15 squad friendlies.

He then represented Italy at the 2019 UEFA European Under-17 Championship where they reached the final, 2019 FIFA U-17 World Cup and the 2022 UEFA European Under-19 Championship, where Giovane was team's captain as Italy reached the semi-final.

References

External links
 

2003 births
Sportspeople from Ravenna
Living people
Italian footballers
Italy youth international footballers
Association football midfielders
Serie B players
Atalanta B.C. players
Ascoli Calcio 1898 F.C. players